is a public junior high school in Tomi, Nagano, Japan.

history 

Notable

References 

High schools in Nagano Prefecture
Education in Nagano Prefecture
Tōmi, Nagano